Claybord Black is a clay coated hardboard panel for scratchboard that is coated with India ink. Comparable to traditional paper scratchboard, it’s more durable and easier to scratch into for cleaner and crisper details and lines. For added dimension, colored inks can be added to the white areas and then scratched again for additional highlights and volume.

External links
 Manufacture - Ampersand Art Supply
 Inventor - Charles Ewing
 The New Scratchbord by Charles Ewing, 
 How to Create Art without Knowing How to Draw a Straight Line by Arlene Wright-Correll - 
 The Scratchbord Art Series of Arlene Wright-Correll

Visual arts materials